The following is a list of toll roads in Florida.  Florida has  of toll roads, bridges and causeways as of June 2013, more than any other state.  The longest of these is Florida's Turnpike, running , opened in 1957.  The majority of the toll roads have state road designations with a special toll shield, including the Turnpike and Homestead Extension.

Florida's Turnpike Enterprise, a part of the Florida Department of Transportation, owns and operates Florida's Turnpike and the Homestead Extension, the Sawgrass Expressway (SR 869) in Broward County, Polk Parkway (SR 570) in Polk County, Suncoast Parkway (SR 589), Veterans Expressway (SR 568/SR 589) in the Tampa Bay Area, the northern end of Seminole Expressway (SR 417), the southern six miles (10 km) of Southern Connector Extension (SR 417), the southern  of Daniel Webster Western Beltway (SR 429) and the western eight miles (13 km) of Beachline West Expressway (SR 528) in the Orlando Area.

The Turnpike collects tolls in the portion of I-75 known as Alligator Alley, the Sunshine Skyway Bridge, the Pinellas Bayway System and the Beachline East (State Road 528) — all FDOT-owned roads and bridges.  It also provides toll collection services for the Garcon Point and Mid-Bay Bridges in Florida's Panhandle as well as the Lee Roy Selmon Expressway in Tampa.  These roads, as well as the roads on the Central Florida Expressway Authority system (Apopka Expressway, Beachline Expressway east of exit 8, Central Florida GreeneWay, East-West Expressway, and the Western Beltway) are compatible with SunPass and benefit from an average of 25% discount.

Toll roads

Managed lanes
In Florida, all vehicles in managed lanes are required to have a SunPass, Peach Pass, E-ZPass, or NC Quick Pass to use the lanes. The Lee Roy Selmon Express lanes permits Toll by plate travel as well as the use of transponders.

Toll bridges and causeways

Future toll projects
  -— An additional  of variable toll lanes along the I-4 Express are currently being studied, which would cover the Orlando metropolitan area.
A  segment has already been completed in the summer of 2019. The remaining segment is under design, but not yet scheduled for construction.
 , SR 686A (Gateway Express) -— Elevated east–west highway in central Pinellas County. Project approved in 2014. Construction to begin in 2017 & be complete in 2023.
 Central Polk Parkway -— Elevated east–west highway in central Polk County. Project approved in 2014. Construction to begin in 2017 & be complete in 2022.
 Heartland Parkway -— Proposed  toll road through interior counties, from southwest of the Orlando metro area to the Fort Myers-Naples area.
 Southport Connector—a connector from the eastern terminus of the Poinciana Parkway (SR538) to Florida's Turnpike

See also

References

Lists of roads in Florida